Karen Tracey Blackett  (born 7 August 1971) is a British Barbadian businesswoman who works in the advertising industry and is the CEO of Group M. She became the Chancellor of the University of Portsmouth in October 2017.

Early life 
Blackett grew up in Reading with her mother who was a nurse, her bus conductor father and her sister. She is originally from the Caribbean and her mother moved to London to work in the Royal Berkshire Hospital as a nurse in the 1960s. She grew up around a lot of people from Barbados and other West Indian islands.

Education 
Blackett went to the University of Portsmouth and graduated in 1992 with a degree in geography.

Work 
After university, Blackett applied for a job advertised as a media auditor with CIA MediaNetwork. "I got through the first interview and then they asked me to give a presentation on the pros and cons of Sky TV. I didn't get that job but they suggested I talk to someone in media planning. I think it's because I was so gobby." In October 1995, she continued her career by joining Zenith Media as a senior communications planner and buyer working on the prestigious BT account.  In 1995, she was promoted to the board of directors of the newly merged MediaCom and The Media Business Group Board. She was later head-hunted by The Media Business Group. In January 2003, Blackett moved from her business director role to become the marketing director of MediaCom, then, in 2008, became MediaCom's chief operation director for Europe, the Middle East and Africa. She was promoted to CEO of the UK office in January 2011.

Working with Tim Campbell MBE and The National Apprentice Service, in 2012, Blackett launched an apprenticeship scheme at Mediacom for women aged 18 to 24. In 2015, she was promoted to chair of MediaCom UK, and, in 2016, named as the company's president.

Blackett has also worked with a life coach for over ten years as she claimed in an interview, has helped her both professionally and personally.

Awards and recognition
In 2003 and 2005, she was voted by Management Today as one of the 35 Most Powerful Women Under 35 in the UK. Blackett has featured on the UK's 100 most influential black women 5 times, and received an OBE in the 2014 Birthday Honours for services to media and communications.

Blackett was the first businesswoman to top the Powerlist in 2015. She was on the 2015 Radio 4 Woman's Hour Power List of The Top Ten Influencers.

Personal life 
Blackett is a single mother to Isaac, born 2010, and lives in Chiswick.

References

Further reading 
 

1971 births
Alumni of the University of Portsmouth
Living people
People from Reading, Berkshire
Women in advertising
Fellows of King's College London